Tabebuia elliptica is a species of Tabebuia tree native to Brazil and Bolivia.

References

elliptica